Beyond the Wall is an EP by the German heavy metal band Rage, released in 1992. The songs "Bury All Life" and "I Want You" was taken for bonus tracks for the Trapped!'s 2002 remaster, and the songs "On the Edge", "Dust" and "The Body Talks" for Execution Guaranteed's 2002 remaster.

Track listing

Personnel

Band members 
Peter "Peavy" Wagner – vocals, bass, arrangements
Manni Schmidt – guitars
Chris Ephthimiadis – drums

Rage (German band) albums
1992 EPs
Noise Records EPs